Nagamangalam may refer to any of the following villages in Tamil Nadu, India:

 Nagamangalam, Ariyalur district
 Nagamangalam, Krishnagiri district
 Nagamangalam, Sivaganga district
 Nagamangalam, Tiruchirappalli district